The 2011 James Madison Dukes football team represented James Madison University in the 2011 NCAA Division I FCS football season. The Dukes were led by 13th year head coach Mickey Matthews and played their home games at Bridgeforth Stadium and Zane Showker Field. They are a member of the Colonial Athletic Association. They finished the season 8–5, 5–3 in CAA play to finish in a tie for fifth place. They received an at-large bid into the FCS playoffs where they defeated Eastern Kentucky in the first round before falling to North Dakota State in the second round.

Schedule

References

James Madison
James Madison Dukes football seasons
James Madison
James Madison Dukes football